Major Peter John Cashin (March 8, 1890 – May 21, 1977) was a businessman, soldier and politician in Newfoundland.

Early life
Cashin, a son of Sir Michael Cashin, joined the Newfoundland Regiment during World War I and ultimately served in the British Machine Gun Corps. He returned to the family fishery supply business upon being demobilized.

Political career
He entered politics winning election to the Newfoundland House of Assembly as a Liberal-Labour-Progressive in 1923 before crossing the floor to join the Newfoundland Liberal Party in 1925 in a dispute over tariff policy. He served as minister of finance from 1928 to 1932 when he resigned from the government and accused Sir Richard Squires, the Prime Minister of Newfoundland, of falsifying the minutes of Executive Council meetings to cover up certain legal fees he had been paying himself out of public funds. His actions precipitated a general election that defeated the Squires government but also cost him his own seat in the legislature. Cashin moved to Montreal in 1933 returning to Newfoundland in 1942.

Opposition to the Commission of Government and joining Canada
In his day he was considered one of the best orators in Newfoundland. Upon his return to the island he embarked on a campaign opposing the Commission of Government which had been brought about in 1934. Elected to the National Convention formed in 1946 to consider the British colony's future.

In 1947, Cashin was one of the members of the National Convention's delegation to London charged with finding out what assistance the British government was prepared to give Newfoundland in the future including development aid or cancellation of the dominion's debt. The results were disappointing as Britain refused to give Newfoundland any promise of financial assistance.

Nevertheless, he opposed Joey Smallwood's campaign to join Canadian Confederation and became the leader of the Responsible Government League leading it into the 1948 referendums on Newfoundland's status. On May 17, 1947, Cashin delivered this speech to the National Convention regarding the future of Newfoundland. 

Cashin was unsuccessful in the referendum, though he was convinced that he had actually won and that the referendum result had been falsified by the British.

Later political career
After Newfoundland joined Canada in 1949, Cashin was elected to the provincial legislature as an independent. In 1951, he joined the Newfoundland Progressive Conservatives leading it into that year's provincial election in which the party won five seats. He served as leader of the opposition until 1953 when he quit the Tories to run again as an independent. Defeated in the election, Cashin then served as director of civil defence for the province until 1965.

Cashin's nephew, Richard Cashin, was a politician in the 1960s and subsequently an important trade union leader in the province.

References

External links
Peter Cashin biography
 remarks by Peter Cashin at the National Convention Real Audio
Peter Cashin biography
 

1890 births
1977 deaths
Newfoundland military personnel of World War I
Newfoundland National Convention members
Progressive Conservative Party of Newfoundland and Labrador MHAs
Newfoundland and Labrador political party leaders
Newfoundland People's Party MHAs
Royal Newfoundland Regiment officers
Machine Gun Corps officers